Dry Creek is a mostly industrial suburb north of Adelaide, containing significant wetlands. A substantial area was devoted to salt crystallisation pans until 2014, with plans to redevelop the site for housing. 

This housing plan, first put forward in 2008, was revived in 2013, for a proposed 10,000 homes. Salt production ceased in 2014, and in 2016 Ridley Corporation, which managed the salt pans, sold the land to Adelaide Resource Recovery.

Description
It is named for the Dry Creek, a stream and drain which flows through the suburb and into Swan Alley, a tidal distributary of Barker Inlet, Gulf St Vincent.

It was the site of the soapworks of W. H. Burford & Sons from 1923 (adjacent to the Dry Creek railway station, and formerly used for smelting ore from Broken Hill) and a pioneering "garden suburb" for its employees, designed by W. J. Earle (who also laid out Cadbury's model town at Claremont, Tasmania). The name Burford Gardens has vanished, but its streets remain: Flame Avenue, Gum Avenue, Wattle Avenue, Grevillea Avenue and Bushwood Avenue.

The buildings of the former Dry Creek explosives depot, now State heritage-listed, are on Magazine Road between the Salisbury Highway South Road Connector and the salt pans.

Wetlands
The Dry Creek wetlands are composed of many separate sections running from the eastern edge of the suburb to the sea outlet of Dry Creek. They form part of the storm water management system for the City of Salisbury and the City of Port Adelaide Enfield and are connected to numerous drains that run across the Adelaide Plains including the eponymous Dry Creek, as well as being the outflow point for storm water pipes. Some of the wetlands have been extensively landscaped but have only limited public access.

The wetlands form a fauna and flora haven with one of the southernmost mangrove habitats in the world, extensive reed and samphire beds and a large bird and fish population. They discharge via North Arm creek into the Barker Inlet of Gulf St Vincent.  The wetlands are part of the Gulf St Vincent Important Bird Area.

Transport 

Dry Creek railway station is located on the Gawler railway line. The Northfield railway line, which branched eastwards from Dry Creek station, was closed in 1987.

Dry Creek was a site of a bogie exchange used to overcome a Break of gauge.

The Port River Expressway traverses Dry Creek east–west, and the North–South Motorway provides a new north–south route through the suburb.

See also
 Northern Connector

References

External links
 City of Salisbury
 City of Port Adelaide Enfield 

Suburbs of Adelaide